Nick Estcourt (1942 – 12 June 1978), educated at Eastbourne College, was a British climber killed on K2 by an avalanche on the West Ridge route. He took part in the 1970 British Annapurna South Face expedition. One of his notable achievements, with Paul ('Tut') Braithwaite was the first ascent of the Rock Band, a line of cliffs on the expedition to the South West Face of Everest in 1975 that had defeated several previous expeditions.

Since 1980, the Nick Estcourt Award, established in his memory, to encourage future generations of mountaineers, grants financial assistance annually to expeditions who attempt a significant  mountaineering  objective.

See also
 Brammah
 Joe Tasker
 Kishtwar Himalaya
 List of climbers
 List of deaths on eight-thousanders
 Peter Boardman
 Baintha Brakk, also known as The Ogre

References

External links
 Biography by Chris Bonington
 Nick Estcourt Award winners

1942 births
1978 deaths
Alumni of Magdalene College, Cambridge
Deaths in avalanches
English mountain climbers
Mountaineering deaths on K2